Robert Cornthwaite may refer to:

 Robert Cornthwaite (footballer) (born 1985), English-Australian football (soccer) player
 Robert Cornthwaite (actor) (1917–2006), American film and television character actor
 Robert Cornthwaite (bishop) (1818–1890), English prelate of the Roman Catholic Church